Stelis segoviensis is a species of orchid plant native to Nicaragua.

References 

segoviensis
Flora of Nicaragua